Norkom Technologies was a specialist provider of financial crime and compliance software founded in Dublin in 1998.

In November 2004, Dublin-based risk and compliance software vendor Norkom Technologies signed a definitive agreement to acquire Belgium-based risk management firm Data4s.

In 2011, it was acquired by BAE Systems and merged into their subsidiary Detica (now BAE Systems Applied Intelligence).

References

External links
 

Financial software companies
Software companies of Ireland
Companies based in Dublin (city)
Companies established in 1998
BAE Systems subsidiaries and divisions